Xanthosoma is a genus of flowering plants in the arum family, Araceae. The genus is native to tropical America but widely cultivated and naturalized in other tropical regions. Several are grown for their starchy corms, an important food staple of tropical regions, known variously as malanga, otoy, otoe, cocoyam (or new cocoyam), tannia, tannier, yautía, macabo, ocumo, macal, taioba, dasheen, quequisque, ʻape and (in Papua New Guinea) as Singapore taro (taro kongkong). Many other species, including especially Xanthosoma roseum, are used as ornamental plants; in popular horticultural literature these species may be known as ‘ape due to resemblance to the true Polynesian ʻape, Alocasia macrorrhizos, or as elephant ear from visual resemblance of the leaf to an elephant's ear. Sometimes the latter name is also applied to members in the closely related genera Caladium, Colocasia (taro), and Alocasia.

Unlike the leaves of Colocasia, those of Xanthosoma are usually not peltate- the upper v-notch extends into the point of attachment of the leaf petiole to the blade.

Reproduction 
The inflorescence in Xanthosoma is composed of a spadix with pistillate flowers at the base, a belt of sterile flowers offered as a reward for pollinators in the middle and staminate flowers on the upper part. Prior to opening, the inflorescence is enclosed within a leaf-like spathe. When the inflorescence is ready to open, the upper part of the spathe opens and exposes the staminate area of the spadix; the basal area of the spathe remains closed, forming a spacious chamber (i.e., the spathe tube) that encloses the pistillate and sterile flowers.

The inflorescences last for two nights and are protogynous in some, but not all species. They change from the pistillate phase that attracts pollinators on the night it opens, to a staminate phase on the second night, when pollen is shed. When the inflorescence opens, it produces heat and releases a sweet scent attracting its pollinators, dynastine beetles (Cyclocephala spp.). Dynastines arrive covered with pollen from another inflorescence and remain in the spathe tube for 24 hours, pollinating the pistillate flowers as they feed on the sterile area of the spadix. On the second night, they come out of the tube and walk over the staminate flowers, getting covered with pollen, and then flying to a recently opened inflorescence nearby..
Fruit maturation takes several months. Fruits start to develop within the shelter of the spathe tube. When the infructescence
is mature, in some species, it arches back and downwards. In other species, it stays erect. Then, the tissue of the spathe tube rolls outwards, exhibiting the bright orange fruits and the velvety pink inner spathe surface.

Taxonomy

Species 
The following species are accepted:
Xanthosoma acutum E.G.Gonç. - French Guiana, Amapá State of Brazil
Xanthosoma akkermansii (G.S.Bunting) Croat - Amazonas + Barinas States of Venezuela
Xanthosoma aristeguietae (G.S.Bunting) Madison - Venezuela, northwestern Brazil
Xanthosoma auriculatum Regel - northwestern Brazil
Xanthosoma baguense Croat - northern Peru
Xanthosoma bayo G.S.Bunting - Venezuela
Xanthosoma belophyllum (Willd.) Kunth - Colombia, Venezuela, the Guianas; naturalized in Dominican Republic
Xanthosoma bilineatum Rusby - Colombia
Xanthosoma bolivaranum G.S.Bunting - Venezuela
 Xanthosoma brasiliense (Desf.) Engl. – Tahitian spinach - Lesser Antilles, Puerto Rico, Hispaniola, Trinidad & Tobago; naturalized in southern Brazil
Xanthosoma brevispathaceum Engl. - Peru
Xanthosoma caladioides Grayum - Panama
 Xanthosoma caracu K.Koch & C.D.Bouché – yautia horqueta - Puerto Rico, Dominican Republic
Xanthosoma caulotuberculatum G.S.Bunting - Venezuela
Xanthosoma conspurcatum Schott - Venezuela, Suriname, French Guiana
Xanthosoma contractum G.S.Bunting - Bolívar State of Venezuela
Xanthosoma cordatum N.E.Br. - Guyana, French Guiana
Xanthosoma cordifolium N.E.Br. - Guyana
Xanthosoma cubense (Schott) Schott - Cuba
Xanthosoma daguense Engl. - Colombia, Ecuador
Xanthosoma dealbatum Grayum - Costa Rica
 Xanthosoma eggersii Engl. - Ecuador
Xanthosoma exiguum G.S.Bunting - Amazonas State of Venezuela
Xanthosoma flavomaculatum Engl. - Colombia
Xanthosoma fractum Madison - Peru
Xanthosoma granvillei Croat & Thomps. - French Guiana
Xanthosoma guttatum Croat & D.C.Bay - Valle del Cauca in Colombia
Xanthosoma hebetatum Croat & D.C.Bay - Valle del Cauca in Colombia
 Xanthosoma helleborifolium (Jacq.) Schott – belembe silvestre - from Costa Rica south to central Brazil; naturalized in West Indies
 Xanthosoma herrerae Croat & P.Huang - Colombia
Xanthosoma hylaeae Engl. & K.Krause - Colombia, Ecuador, Peru, Bolivia, northwestern Brazil
Xanthosoma latestigmatum Bogner & E.G.Gonç. - Venezuela
Xanthosoma longilobum G.S.Bunting - Venezuela
Xanthosoma lucens E.G.Gonç - Rondônia
Xanthosoma mafaffoides G.S.Bunting - Amazonas State of Venezuela
Xanthosoma mariae Bogner & E.G.Gonç. - Peru
Xanthosoma maroae G.S.Bunting - Amazonas State of Venezuela
Xanthosoma maximiliani Schott - eastern Brazil
Xanthosoma mendozae Matuda - México State in central México
 Xanthosoma mexicanum Liebm. - Chiapas, Oaxaca, Central America, Colombia, Venezuela
 Xanthosoma narinoense Bogner & L.P.Hannon - Colombia
Xanthosoma nitidum G.S.Bunting - Venezuela
†Xanthosoma obtusilobum Engl. - Mexico, probably extinct
Xanthosoma orinocense G.S.Bunting - Amazonas State of Venezuela
Xanthosoma paradoxum (Bogner & Mayo) Bogner - Colombia
Xanthosoma pariense G.S.Bunting - Venezuela
Xanthosoma peltatum G.S.Bunting - Venezuela
Xanthosoma pentaphyllum (Schott) Engl. - Brazil
Xanthosoma platylobum (Schott) Engl. - Brazil
Xanthosoma plowmanii Bogner - Brazil
Xanthosoma poeppigii Schott - Peru, Bolivia, northwestern Argentina
Xanthosoma pottii E.G.Gonç. - Mato Grosso do Sul
Xanthosoma puberulum Croat - Bolivia
 Xanthosoma pubescens Poepp. - Ecuador, Peru, Bolivia, northwestern Brazil
Xanthosoma pulchrum E.G.Gonç. - Mato Grosso
Xanthosoma riedelianum (Schott) Schott - southeastern Brazil
Xanthosoma riparium E.G.Gonç. - Goiás
 Xanthosoma robustum Schott – capote - Mexico, Central America; naturalized in Hawaii
 Xanthosoma sagittifolium (L.) Schott (Syn. Xanthosoma atrovirens K.Koch & C.D.Bouché,  Xanthosoma violaceum Schott)- arrowleaf elephant ear, tiquizque,  or American taro - Costa Rica, Panama, Venezuela, Colombia, Ecuador, Peru, Bolivia, Brazil; naturalized in West Indies, Africa, Bangladesh, Borneo, Malaysia, Christmas Island, Norfolk Island, some Pacific Islands, Alabama, Florida, Texas, Georgia, Oaxaca
Xanthosoma saguasense G.S.Bunting - Venezuela
Xanthosoma seideliae Croat - Bolivia
Xanthosoma stenospathum Madison - Peru
 Xanthosoma striatipes (K.Koch & C.D.Bouché) Madison - Brazil, the Guianas, Venezuela, Colombia, Bolivia, Paraguay
Xanthosoma striolatum Mart. ex Schott - French Guiana, northern Brazil
Xanthosoma syngoniifolium Rusby - Bolivia, Argentina, Brazil
Xanthosoma taioba E.G.Gonç. - Paraíba
Xanthosoma tarapotense Engl. - Peru
Xanthosoma trichophyllum K.Krause - Peru, Ecuador
Xanthosoma trilobum G.S.Bunting - Amazonas State of Venezuela
Xanthosoma ulei Engl. - northwestern Brazil
 Xanthosoma undipes (K.Koch) K.Koch – tall elephant's ear	- widespread from Bolivia north to southern Mexico and West Indies
  Xanthosoma viviparum Madison - Peru, Ecuador
 Xanthosoma weeksii Madison - Ecuador
 Xanthosoma wendlandii (Schott) Schott (syn. Xanthosoma hoffmannii Schott, Xanthosoma pedatum Hemsl.) Oaxaca, Central America, Venezuela
Xanthosoma yucatanense Engl. - Yucatán, Quintana Roo

Deprecated 
Caladium lindenii (André) Madison (as X. lindenii (André) Engl.)

Etymology 
It refers to the stigma or yellow inner tissues.

Uses 

Domestication of Xanthosoma species (especially X. sagittifolium but also X. atrovirens, X. violaceum, X. maffaffa and others) is thought to have originated in northern lowland South America, then spread to the Antilles and Mesoamerica. Today, Xanthosoma is still grown in all those regions, but is especially popular in Cuba, the Dominican Republic and Puerto Rico, where it is used in alcapurrias or boiled. It is grown in Trinidad and Tobago, Guyana and Jamaica to make the popular callaloo dish. It is also grown in West Africa, now a major producer, where it can be used as a replacement for yams in a popular regional dish called fufu. Xanthosoma is also grown as a crop in the Philippines.

Traditionally, Xanthosoma has been a subsistence crop with excess sold at local markets, but in the United States, large numbers of Latin American immigrants have created a market for commercial production. In general, production has yet to meet demand in some areas. In Polynesia, Alocasia macrorrhizos (‘ape) was considered a famine food, used only in the event of failure of the much preferred taro (kalo) crop.  After having been introduced to Hawaiʻi in the 1920s from S. America, "Xanthosoma" has naturalized and has become more common than A. macrorrhizos, and has adopted the same name, ʻape.

The typical Xanthosoma plant has a growing cycle of 9 to 11 months, during which time it produces a large stem called a corm, this  surrounded by smaller edible cormels about the size of potatoes. These cormels (like the corm) are rich in starch. Their taste has been described as earthy and nutty, and they are a common ingredient in soups and stews. They may also be eaten grilled, fried, or puréed. The young, unfurled leaves of some varieties can be eaten as boiled leafy vegetables or used in soups and stews, such as the Caribbean callaloo.
 
Flour made from Xanthosoma species is hypoallergenic.

Gallery

References

External links

 Xanthosoma spp. at Purdue University, Center for New Crops & Plants Products
 Distribution and names of edible aroids

 
Araceae genera
Root vegetables
Leaf vegetables
Staple foods